The 2020 FAI Women's Cup Final was the final match of the 2020 FAI Women's Cup, the national association football Cup of the Republic of Ireland. The match took place on 12 December 2020 at Tallaght Stadium in Dublin. Cork City and Peamount United contested the match.

The match was shown live on RTÉ2 and RTÉ2 HD in Ireland, and via the RTÉ Player worldwide with commentary from Ger Canning and Lisa Fallon. It was refereed by Claire Purcell, assisted by Ann Sweeney and Olivia Syned with Vickey McEnery as Fourth Official. The Reserve Official was Kate O'Brien.

League champions Peamount United won the Cup to claim a "double", avenge their defeats in the previous two finals and reclaim the trophy they won for the first time in 2010. Underdogs Cork City were unable to emulate their only previous win in 2017.

Match

Summary
The match remained scoreless until half-time. On 46 minutes Stephanie Roche scored to give Peamount the lead, then scored again five minutes later. With 13 minutes of the match remaining, Roche made an assist to Áine O'Gorman who scored Peamount's third. As Cork City's young players tired, Peamount became increasingly dominant. Karen Duggan headed in O'Gorman's corner kick on 81 minutes, before substitutes Rebecca Watkins and Tiegan Ruddy added late goals to make the final score 6–0.

Details

References

External links
RTÉ's full match coverage on RTÉ Player

Final
FAI Women's Cup finals
December 2020 sports events in Europe